Avang Music ( lit. Pendulum) is a record label and TV channel based in Los Angeles, California. Avang Music is the parent company of Avang Records Inc, Avang TV, and Mystery4 Productions, which handles all the live events and concerts organized by Avang Music.

Avang Music has gained a reputation for working with top Persian artists in the market and for having one of the largest audio and video catalogs in the Persian music industry. The company has produced and distributed music from a wide range of genres, including pop, rock, classical, and traditional Persian music.

In addition to producing and distributing music, Avang Music has also made a significant impact in the Persian entertainment industry through its affiliate companies. Avang Records Inc is responsible for producing and distributing music, while Avang TV broadcasts music videos, interviews, and other music-related content. Mystery4 Productions handles all the live events and concerts organized by Avang Music, and has successfully organized concerts and shows featuring some of the biggest Persian music artists.

Avang Music's commitment to quality and innovation has been instrumental in its success. The company has continuously adapted to changing market trends and has remained at the forefront of the Persian music industry. Its dedication to supporting Persian artists and promoting Persian culture has also earned it a loyal fan base and a strong reputation in the industry.

Roster
Musicians signed to Avang Music:

25Band
Ahllam
Amir Farjam
Amir Tataloo
Afshin
Andy
Aref
Ashkan Pooya
Baran
Bahador Kharazmi
Behrooz
Black Cats
Gheysar
Hamid Rasti
Hamid Sefat
Hengameh
Jamshid
Keyvan
Kamran - Hooman
Mahsa Navi
Maziar Ahmadi
Mehrshad
Nahal
Navid Rasti
Pimo Band
Pimo Band
Rahi
Sepideh
Shadmehr Aghili
Saeed Kermani
Shahab Tiam
Shahram Shabpareh
Shahram Solati
Shahyad
Saeed Shayesteh
Siavash Ghomayshi
Shohreh
Valy

References

External links
 Official website 
 
 Avang Music on Facebook 
 Avang Music on Instagram 

Atlantic Records
American record labels
Record labels established in 1992
Persian pop music
Persian music
Iranian record labels